Ali Sotto (born Maria Aloha Leilani Sancianco Carag; May 29, 1961) is a Filipino actress, radio broadcaster and former news anchor and singer. Her previous screen name was Aloha and now Ali Sotto. She is popularly heard on radio programs of Super Radyo DZBB 594, Saksi sa Dobol B: Sino? and Dobol A sa Dobol B with Arnold Clavio.

Personal life and career

Sotto was separated from her first husband Maru Sotto, but they remained intimate friends. Today, she is married to her second husband, Omar Bsaies, who is also a retired diplomat.

As Maru Sotto's wife, Helen Gamboa and Dina Bonnevie were her sisters-in-law and the Sotto brothers were her brothers-in-law: Val, Tito and Vic Sotto. With Maru, they had two children, Chino Sotto and Miko Sotto, who died young.

She was a host of the television shows Ali! and Metro, which was the sole public service program at that time on television, and the only public affiliate program of ABC (now 5) that earns. She used to co-host Sino? with Mike Enriquez and Arnold Clavio from 9:00 AM to 10:00 AM and Dobol A sa Dobol B, a DZBB program, with Clavio every Monday to Friday from 10:00 AM to 11:00 AM until 2020.

It was an exception that TV hosts could invite successive showbiz names as their guests in just a few months. These were Vilma Santos, Maricel Soriano, Sharon Cuneta, Susan Roces and Dolphy. She was the only one who was courageous enough to ask questions directly to Susan Roces if she believed Fernando Poe Jr. had an illegitimate child.

Filmography

Film

Television

Radio

References

External links

1961 births
Living people
Ali
Filipino film actresses
Filipino women television presenters
Filipino television actresses
Filipino television news anchors
Filipino radio personalities
Filipino radio journalists
ABS-CBN personalities
GMA Network personalities
GMA Integrated News and Public Affairs people
TV5 (Philippine TV network) personalities
News5 people